Nina Grunfeld (born 1954) is a British writer, journalist, public speaker and entrepreneur.

Career
Trained as a graphic designer in Reading University and Harrow Art College her first book was Spot Check, a stain removal manual which sold widely. In 1982 she wrote The Royal Shopping Guide  which detailed the UK's Royal Warrant Holders. With the birth of her first child in 1987 she wrote Pregnancy Week by Week  for the baby and child chain of shops, Mothercare.

Together with her old nanny, Nanny Smith she created the Nanny Knows Best  series of books and the 1993 BBC1 television series of the same name.

In 2004 she wrote The Big Book of Me, started her Get a Life  column for the Daily Telegraph and founded Life Clubs, a workshop-based system for self-development.

References

External links
  - Life Clubs

1954 births
Living people